St. Joseph's School, St. Joseph's Catholic School, St Joseph's School, St Joseph's Catholic School, and variants are frequently used school names, and may refer to:

Africa
St Joseph's School, Addis Ababa, Ethiopia

Asia
St Joseph Higher Secondary School, Dhaka, Bangladesh
St Joseph's High School, East Timor
St Joseph's College, Hong Kong
St Joseph's Anglo-Chinese School, Hong Kong
SM St Joseph Papar, Malaysia
St. Joseph's Institution, Singapore, a secondary school
CHIJ Saint Joseph's Convent, a secondary school in Sengkang, Singapore
Lycée Saint-Joseph, Istanbul, Turkey
Choi Wan St. Joseph's Primary School, Ngau Chi Wan, Hong Kong

India
St. Joseph's School, Bhaktinagar, Siliguri, West Bengal
St. Joseph's School, Jamtara
St. Joseph's Convent School Hoshiarpur, Punjab
St Joseph's co-ed Sr. Sec. School, Bhopal
St Joseph's Boys' High School, Bangalore
St Joseph's Boys' School, Jalandhar, Punjab
St Joseph's Boys' High School, Pune
St Joseph's Matriculation Higher Secondary School
St Joseph's High School, Dharwad, Karnataka
St Joseph's Convent High School, Adilabad
St Joseph's Convent School, Bhopal
St Joseph's Convent High School, Mumbai
St Joseph's Convent School, Sagar
St Joseph's Convent, Chandannagar
St Joseph's Co-Ed School, Bhopal
St Joseph's Evening College, Bangalore
St Joseph's Higher Secondary School, Cuddalore
St Joseph's Higher Secondary School, Thalassery
St Joseph’s High School, Bhubaneswar
St. Joseph's High School, Juhu, Mumbai
St Joseph's High School, Trimulgherry
St Joseph’s Higher Secondary School, Baramulla
St Joseph's School, Darjeeling
St Joseph's School, Fazilnagar
St Joseph's School, Karwar, Karnataka
St Joseph's Primary School, Mysore
St Joseph's Convent High School, Patna
St Joseph's Convent School, Kalpetta
St Joseph's Convent School, Rourkela
Kilbil St Joseph's High School, Nashik
St. Joseph's School, Giridih
St. Joseph's School, Gorakhpur

Pakistan
St Joseph's English High School, Gujranwala, Punjab
St Joseph's College, Karachi, Sindh
St Joseph's Convent School, Karachi, Sindh

Philippines
St. Joseph College–Olongapo, Inc., Olongapo City, Zambales
Saint Joseph School–La Salle, Bacolod City, Negros Occidental
St Joseph School of San Jose City, Nueva Ecija (once known as St Joseph School)
St. Joseph's College of Quezon City, Quezon City, Metro Manila

Europe
 Institut Sankt Joseph Copenhagen, Denmark
 St Joseph's School, Roskilde, Denmark
 St. Joseph's Secondary School, Rush, Ireland

United Kingdom

England
St Joseph's Catholic Academy, Hebburn, Tyne and Wear
St Joseph's Catholic College, Bradford (merged with St Bede's Grammar School to become St Bede's and St Joseph's Catholic College)
St Joseph's Catholic High School, Slough, Berkshire
St Joseph's Catholic High School, Workington, Cumbria
St Joseph's Catholic College, Swindon, Wiltshire
St Joseph's Catholic Primary School in Bingley, Bradford, West Yorkshire
St Joseph's Catholic Primary School in Little Horton, Bradford, West Yorkshire
St Joseph's Catholic Primary School in Keighley, Bradford, West Yorkshire
St Joseph's Catholic School, Laverstock, Wiltshire
St Joseph's College, Ipswich, Suffolk
St Joseph's College, Reading, Berkshire, previously known as St Joseph's Convent School
St Joseph's College, Stoke-on-Trent, Staffordshire
St Joseph's College, Upper Norwood, London Borough of Croydon
St Joseph's In The Park, Hertingfordbury, Hertfordshire
St Joseph's Preparatory School, Stoke-on-Trent, Staffordshire
St Joseph's RC High School, Horwich, Greater Manchester
St Joseph's R.C. Middle School, Hexham, Northumberland
St Joseph's RC Primary School, a school in Hurst Green, Lancashire

Northern Ireland

St Joseph's Boys' High School, Newry, County Armagh
St Joseph's College, Coalisland, County Tyrone
St Joseph's Boys' School, Derry
St Joseph's College, Coleraine, County Londonderry

Scotland
St Joseph's College, Dumfries, Dumfries and Galloway

Wales
St Joseph's Roman Catholic High School, Newport
St Joseph's Catholic and Anglican High School, Wrexham
St Joseph's R.C. Primary School, Cardiff

North America

Canada

Collège Saint-Joseph de Hull, a private secondary school for girls in Gatineau, Quebec
École St. Joseph School, Whitecourt, Alberta
École St. Joseph School, Yellowknife, Northwest Territories
St. Joseph High School (Ottawa), Ontario
St. Joseph High School (Saskatoon), Saskatchewan
St. Joseph Secondary School (Mississauga), Ontario
St. Joseph Catholic High School (Edmonton), Alberta
St. Joseph's Catholic High School (Windsor, Ontario)
St. Joseph's High School (Barrie), Ontario
St. Joseph's High School (Renfrew), Ontario
St. Joseph's High School (St. Thomas, Ontario)
St. Joseph's College School (Toronto, Ontario)
St. Joseph's Morrow Park Catholic Secondary School (North York, Ontario)
Michael Power/St. Joseph High School (Islington, Ontario)
St. Joseph's Secondary School (Cornwall, Ontario)

United States
(by state then city)

St. Joseph High School (Conway, Arkansas)
St. Joseph Catholic High School (Pine Bluff, Arkansas)
St. Joe High School, St. Joe, Arkansas
St. Joseph Notre Dame High School, Alameda, California
St. Joseph's School (La Puente, California)
St. Joseph High School (Lakewood, California)
St. Joseph High School (Santa Maria, California)
Saint Joseph High School (Denver, Colorado)
St. Joseph High School (Connecticut), Trumbull, Connecticut
St. Joseph's Industrial School, Clayton, Delaware, NRHP-listed in Kent County, Delaware
St. Joseph Academy (St. Augustine, Florida)
St. Joseph High School (Hilo, Hawaii) (Junior-Senior High School and Elementary)
St. Joseph High School (Westchester, Illinois)
St. Joseph Indian Normal School, Rensselaer, Indiana, NRHP-listed in Jasper County, Indiana
St. Joseph High School (South Bend, Indiana), NRHP-listed in St. Joseph County, Indiana
St. Joseph's Church and Parochial School, Hays, Kansas, NRHP-listed in Ellis County, Kansas
St. Joseph's Academy (Baton Rouge), Louisiana
St. Joseph School (Jeanerette, Louisiana)
St. Joseph School (Plaucheville, Louisiana)
St. Joseph's School (Biddeford, Maine), Biddeford, Maine, NRHP-listed in York County, Maine
Mount Saint Joseph College, Baltimore, Maryland
St. Joseph's Convent and School, Lowell, Massachusetts, NRHP-listed in Middlesex County, Massachusetts
St. Joseph's School (North Adams, Massachusetts), NRHP-listed in Berkshire County, Massachusetts
St. Joseph Central High School (Pittsfield, Massachusetts)
Saint Joseph School (Wakefield, Massachusetts), NRHP-listed in Middlesex County, Massachusetts
St. Joseph High School (St. Joseph, Michigan)
Saint Joseph's Academy (Saint Paul, Minnesota), listed on the NRHP in Ramsey County, Minnesota
St. Joseph Catholic School (Madison, Mississippi)
St. Joseph's Academy (St. Louis)
St. Joseph High School (Camden, New Jersey) - defunct
St. Joseph High School (Hammonton, New Jersey)
St. Joseph High School (Metuchen, New Jersey)
Saint Joseph Regional High School, Montvale, New Jersey
St. Joseph's Roman Catholic Church Rectory and School, Newark, New Jersey, NRHP-listed
Saint Joseph of the Palisades High School, West New York, New Jersey
St. Joseph High School (Brooklyn)
St. Joseph's Collegiate Institute, Tonawanda, New York
Villa Angela-St. Joseph High School, Cleveland, Ohio
Saint Joseph Central High School (Ironton, Ohio)
St. Joseph's Catholic Church (Wapakoneta, Ohio), NRHP-listed in Auglaize County, Ohio
St. Joseph High School (Natrona Heights, Pennsylvania)
St. Joseph's High School (South Carolina) in Greenville, South Carolina
St. Joseph's Indian School in Chamberlain, South Dakota
St. Joseph Catholic School (Bryan, Texas)
St. Joseph High School (Victoria, Texas)
St. Joseph Catholic High School (Ogden, Utah)
St. Joseph High School (Virgin Islands), St. Croix, Virgin Islands
St. Joseph Central Catholic High School, Huntington, West Virginia
St. Joseph Catholic Academy, Kenosha, Wisconsin

Oceania

Australia
Mercedes College, Perth, Western Australia, once known as "St Joseph's School" or "St Joseph's Primary School"
 St Joseph's School, in Brunswick West, Victoria
 St. Joseph's Primary School, in Cobram in north-east Victoria
 St Joseph's Catholic Primary School, Corinda, Queensland
 St Joseph's Catholic Primary School, in Crib Point, Victoria
 St Joseph's Catholic Primary School, in Elsternwick, Victoria
 St Joseph's Catholic Primary School, in Enfield, New South Wales
 St Joseph's Catholic Primary School, in Mernda, Victoria
 St Joseph's Catholic School, in Mundingburra, Queensland
 Saint Joseph's Primary School, in Warragul, Victoria

New Zealand
St Joseph's School, Wairoa District, Hawke's Bay

Papua New Guinea
St Joseph's School, Mabiri, Bougainville Island

See also
Saint Joseph Academy (disambiguation)
St. Joseph Central High School (disambiguation)
Saint Joseph's College (disambiguation)
Saint Joseph (disambiguation)
Saint Joseph (for background on the saint)